Gajadin is a Surinamese surname. Notable people with the surname include:

 Chitra Gajadin (born 1954), Surinamese author
 Dewperkash Gajadin (born 1961), Surinamese chess master

Surnames of South American origin